Beauséjour riding (formerly known as Beauséjour—Petitcodiac) is a federal electoral district in southeastern New Brunswick, Canada, which has been represented in the House of Commons of Canada since 1988. It replaced Westmorland—Kent, which was represented  from 1968 to 1988.

Beauséjour is largely Acadian and Francophone, with a significant Anglophone section in the southern section of the riding.

The riding consists of most of Westmorland County to the east and north of Moncton; and almost all of Kent County. Major towns in the riding include Shediac, Cap-Pelé, Sackville, Bouctouche and Richibucto. The neighbouring ridings are Miramichi—Grand Lake, Fundy Royal, Moncton—Riverview—Dieppe, and Cumberland—Colchester in Nova Scotia; it is connected to the riding of Malpeque on Prince Edward Island by the Confederation Bridge.

Political geography
Westmorland—Kent was created in 1966 from Kent, and part of Westmorland that was not included in the Moncton riding. It was abolished when it was incorporated into the new riding of Beauséjour in 1987.

Beauséjour was created in 1987 primarily from Westmorland—Kent, incorporating parts of Moncton and Northumberland—Miramichi ridings. Between a 1990 by-election and 1993, it was the seat of Liberal leader and later Prime Minister Jean Chrétien.

In 1997, it was renamed "Beauséjour—Petitcodiac", and expanded to include most of Albert County and the Petitcodiac area of western Westmorland County. This created a "doughnut" around Greater Moncton, which was a separate district.

In 2003, Beauséjour—Petitcodiac was abolished when it was redistributed into a new Beauséjour riding and into Fundy riding.

The new Beauséjour riding was created primarily from Beauséjour—Petitcodiac, incorporating parts of Miramichi and Moncton—Riverview—Dieppe ridings.

As per the 2012 federal electoral redistribution, this riding will lose small territories to Miramichi—Grand Lake and Fundy Royal, but will gain territory from Moncton—Riverview—Dieppe.

Political history

Future Governor General of Canada Roméo LeBlanc represented Beauséjour from 1972 to 1984. His son, Dominic LeBlanc, is its current MP.

Future Prime Minister Jean Chrétien represented Beauséjour for a short time in the early 1990s after he won the Liberal leadership. Chrétien did not have a seat in the House of Commons at the time, and the sitting MP stepped down to allow him to run in a by-election.

Since its creation, the riding has voted Liberal in every election except 1997, when it elected Angela Vautour of the New Democratic Party. Vautour switched to the Progressive Conservatives midway through her term, and was defeated in 2000.

Federal riding associations

Riding associations are the local branches of the national political parties:

Members of Parliament

This riding has elected the following Members of Parliament:

Election results

Beauséjour

2021 general election

2019 general election

2015 general election

2011 general election

2008 general election

2006 general election

2004 general election

Beauséjour—Petitcodiac, 1997–2003

Change for Progressive Conservative candidate Angela Vautour are based on the party's results in 1997.  She personally received 6.88% fewer votes based on her results as an NDP candidate.
Change for the Canadian Alliance for 1997 are based on the results of its predecessor, the Reform Party.

Beauséjour, 1987–1997

All changes are from the 1990 by-election, with the exception of the Progressive Conservative Party, who did not field a candidate.

Westmorland—Kent, 1966–1987

Student Vote results

2011 election
In 2011, a Student Vote was conducted at participating Canadian schools to parallel the 2011 Canadian federal election results. The vote was designed to educate students and simulate the electoral process for persons who have not yet reached the legal majority. Schools with a large student body that reside in another electoral district had the option to vote for candidates outside of the electoral district then where they were physically located.

See also
 List of Canadian federal electoral districts
 Past Canadian electoral districts

References

Notes

External links
Riding history from the Library of Parliament:
Westmorland-Kent 1966-1987
Beauséjour 1987-1997
Beauséjour—Petitcodiac 1997-2003
Beauséjour 2003-present

New Brunswick federal electoral districts
Politics of Dieppe, New Brunswick
Shediac